Catherine Adler is an American Broadway producer who has won 5 Tony Awards and 1 Olivier Award.

Biography 
She began producing Broadway plays and musicals in 2013. Her first production credit was on Vanya and Sonia and Masha and Spike, which won the Tony Award for Best Play in 2013. That year, she also began producing A Gentleman's Guide to Love and Murder and remained on as producer during its first national tour. The original production won the Tony Award for Best Musical in 2014.
 
Also that year, she was a producer on the revival of The Elephant Man which starred Bradley Cooper and Patricia Clarkson and had productions on both Broadway and the West End. The Elephant Man was one of three Adler-produced revivals to be nominated for a Tony in 2015 alongside This Is Our Youth and Skylight, the latter of which ultimately won the award. Throughout 2016 and 2017, she produced several Off-Broadway plays including, The Flick, Small Mouth Sounds, and Baghdaddy. She returned to Broadway later in 2017, producing Steve Martin's Meteor Shower (among others).
 
In 2018, she produced the Broadway revival of Angels in America which would go on to win the Tony Award for Best Revival of a Play that year. As part of CatWenJam Productions, she produced Network, which starred Bryan Cranston. In addition to the aforementioned The Ferryman, Adler produced the Broadway runs for both Tootsie and Be More Chill in 2019.

In 2019 Adler won the Tony Award for Best Play for producing The Ferryman and the Laurence Olivier Award for Best Musical Revival for producing Marianne Elliott's West End production of Company.

In 2020 Adler produced the Tony Award for Best Musical nominee Tina: The Tina Turner Musical as well as Marianne Elliott's Broadway revival of Stephen Sondheim's Company.

Production credits

Nominations and awards

References

External links
Catherine Adler Productions

Broadway theatre producers
Tony Award winners
Year of birth missing (living people)
Living people